General Ibrahim Babangida became head of state after a coup on 27 August 1985, replacing General Muhammadu Buhari. In September 1987 Babangida created Akwa Ibom State from part of Cross River State and Katsina State from part of Kaduna State. In August 1991 he created eleven more states.
He arranged for elections for states governors in 1991, with the military governors handing over to elected civilian governors in January 1992 at the start of the Nigerian Third Republic.

Governors of existing states 
The list below gives governors of the states that were in existence when Babangida took power.

Administrators of new states
The newly created states in August 1991 were run by administrators rather than governors, a term used to reinforce the message that their tenure was interim until elected governors could take over.

In most cases, each new state was carved out of an existing state which retained its name but was now smaller in area. Exceptions were the old Gongola State which was split into Adamawa State and Taraba State, and Kogi State which was formed from parts of Benue State and Kwara State.

References

Nigerian military governors
1980s in Nigeria